Lillsjön means "small lake" in Swedish and may refer to:

 Lillsjön (Ulvsunda) - a lake in western Stockholm.
 Lillsjön - a former lake in Norra Djurgården, north-eastern Stockholm.
 Lillsjön, Norrköping - a lake in Norrköping.